Manucci is an Italian surname. Notable people with the surname include:

Amatino Manucci, inventor of double-entry bookkeeping
Teobaldo Manucci (1449/1452 – 1515), Italian humanist, scholar, educator, and the founder of the Aldine Press
Niccolao Manucci (1639–1717), Italian writer and traveller
Paolo Manucci, or Mannucci (born 1942), Italian former racing cyclist
Dan Manucci (born 1957), American football quarterback

See also
Mannucci

Italian-language surnames